Anti-German may refer to:

Anti-Germans (political current), a branch of anti-nationalist ideology in Germany
Anti-German sentiment, suspicion or hostility towards Germany or the German people